× Forgetara is a hybrid nothogenus of orchid. It is a part of the Oncidium alliance hybrids, a cross between Aspasia × Brassia × Miltonia.  there are 70 species.

Abbreviation: Fgtra

Culture:
 Light: Moderate
 Temp.: Intermediate (day , night )
 water: allow to dry out between watering
 Flowers: about June to July

Species current:

Fgtra Everglades Pioneer '28 Hurrican' AM/AOS in 2004
(× Miltassia × Aspasia principissa)

Fgtra Everglades Pioneer 'Dottie Kone' 

Fgtra Everglades Pioneer 'Talisman Cove'

Forgetara "Mexico"

References

Oncidiinae
Orchid nothogenera